Her Benny may refer to:

 Her Benny (novel), 1879 Victorian novel by British author Silas Hocking
 Her Benny, 1920 British silent romance film adapted from the novel